Gujarat Legislative Assembly or Gujarat Vidhan Sabha is the unicameral legislature of the Indian state of Gujarat, in the state's capital Gandhinagar. As of 2008, 182 members of the Legislative Assembly are directly elected from single-member constituencies. It has term of 5 years, unless it is dissolved sooner. The first assembly was elected in 1962.

Constituencies
In 1962 the first Gujarat Legislative Assembly was elected with 154 seats. In 1966 the number was raised to 166. In 1971 the number was raised to 182. In 1976 the government imposed a moratorium on further changes until after the 2001 Census of India.

2008 to date
Following the 2001 Census of India, a delimitation commission was set up, with Justice Kuldip Singh, a retired Judge of the Supreme Court of India, as its chairperson. The order from the delimitation commission was implemented in 2008. The following is the list of the constituencies established by the 2008 order.

Abdasa in Kutch district is the largest (6278 km2) while Karanj in Surat district is the smallest (4 km2) constituency by area, in the Gujarat Legislative Assembly.

List of Assembly Constituencies
Following is the list of the constituencies of the Gujarat Vidhan Sabha since the delimitation of legislative assembly constituencies in 2008. At present, 13 constituencies are reserved for candidates of the Scheduled Castes, and 27 constituencies are reserved for candidates of the Scheduled tribes.

References

Gujarat
Gujarat-related lists